Sangawi railway station is a small railway station in Pune district, Maharashtra, India. It serves Milindnagar village. The station will consists of two platforms. The station is under-construction and lies on the Phaltan–Daund line.

References

Railway stations in Pune district
Pune railway division